Allen Joseph Ecuyer (October 15, 1937 – April 28, 2012) was an American football player.

Ecuyer was born in New Orleans in 1937 and attended Jesuit High School in that city.

He played college football at the guard position for the Notre Dame Fighting Irish from 1956–1958. He was a starter all three years.  He was a consensus first team All-American in 1957. He was also selected by his teammates as a co-captain of the 1958 Notre Dame Fighting Irish football team.

Ecuyer played in the Canadian Football League at guard and linebacker for the Edmonton Eskimos from 1959 to 1965, the Toronto Argonauts in 1966, and the Montreal Alouettes in 1967 and 1968. He appeared in 141 CFL games. He was a Western Conference All-Star at linebacker in his rookie season. He intercepted 13 passes for 161 yards in his career. 

After his football career, he became a vice-president of investments with Prudential Securities.

Ecuyer died in 2012 in New Orleans.

References

External links
 Al Ecuyer profile

1937 births
2012 deaths
All-American college football players
American players of Canadian football
Canadian football linebackers
Edmonton Elks players
Montreal Alouettes players
Notre Dame Fighting Irish football players
Players of Canadian football from New Orleans
Toronto Argonauts players
Players of American football from New Orleans